Anastasia Zampounidis (born December 28, 1968), is a Greek-German TV host.

Climb to Fame
After graduating from high school, Zampounidis spent time in Los Angeles as an au pair, Go-Go dancer, and language tutor. While in LA she broadcast a radio program for Berlin radio. She ranked #55 2001, #68 2002, #57 2003 and #98 2004 in FHM-Germany's Sexiest Women.

Filmography
"The Dome", (1997) TV Series .... (Backstage Reporter) (2002–2005)
MTV Germany, (host of "Select MTV") (2002)
Rotlicht - Im Dickicht der Großstadt, (TV) .... (Supporting actress) (2003) 
"Comeback - Die große Chance"''' TV Mini Series ... (Jury Member) (2004)"Total Request Live", TV Series .... Host (2004) MTV live show "TRL"'', (daily host) (2005)

External links

1968 births
Living people
German entertainers
German people of Greek descent
Greek DJs
Electronic dance music DJs